Three Standing Forms is an outdoor 1959 sculpture by Jan Zach, installed at the intersection of 8th Avenue and West Park Street, in Eugene, Oregon's Park Blocks, in the United States.

Description and history
The abstract sculpture, made of iron welded onto rock, measures approximately  x  x . It rests on a granite and basalt base that measures approximately  x  x . The work was surveyed and deemed "treatment need" by Smithsonian Institution's "Save Outdoor Sculpture!" program in August 1993.

See also

 1959 in art

References

1959 establishments in Oregon
1959 sculptures
Abstract sculptures in Oregon
Iron sculptures in the United States
Granite sculptures in Oregon
Outdoor sculptures in Eugene, Oregon
Stone sculptures in Oregon